Anthidium banningense is a species of bee in the family Megachilidae, the leaf-cutter, carder, or mason bees.

Distribution
North America

Synonyms
Synonyms for this species include:
Anthidium plumarium Cockerell, 1925
Anthidium longispinum Schwarz, 1927

References

External links
Images

banningense
Insects described in 1904